Knut Hjeltnes (born 16 March 1961) is a Norwegian architect.

He was born in Oslo. He took his education at the Norwegian Institute of Technology, and has been appointed as a professor at the Oslo School of Architecture and Design. He adheres to the modernist style, and has been awarded several prizes.

References

1961 births
Living people
Artists from Oslo
Norwegian Institute of Technology alumni
Academic staff of the Oslo School of Architecture and Design